Mersin İdmanyurdu (also Mersin İdman Yurdu, Mersin İY, or MİY) Sports Club; located in Mersin, east Mediterranean coast of Turkey in 1973–74. The 1973–74 season was the sixth season of Mersin İdmanyurdu (MİY) football team in Turkish First Football League, the first level division in Turkey. They have relegated to second division at the end of the season.

The club address was "Azakhan No: 4", Tel.: 1321. Executive committee: Mehmet Karamehmet (president), Mahir Turhan, Ünal Şıhman, Atilla Taşpınar, Kayhan Okdar, Aydın Özlü, Alptekin Ürgüplü, Yaman Atalay, Sadık Eliyeşil, Mehmet Emin Yıldız, Mustafa Elgin, Erol Tarhan, Reşat Çağlı, Sungur Baydur, Kemal Saraçoğlu.

At the start of the season Motrock Ivon was the coach. He managed the team for three games. He was followed by Nazım Koka. He managed the team for 17 games. After 20th round, Toma Kaloperoviç became the coach on 14.03.1974. Kaloperoviç finished the season.

Pre-season
Preparation games: MİY-Sakaryaspor: 0-0; MİY-Kocaelispor: 2-2; MİY-Gaziantepspor: 1-0.
 19.08.1973 - Eskişehirspor-MİY.
 30.08.1973 -  MİY-Adanaspor: 2-0. Goals: Zeki, Burhan.

1973–74 First League participation
First League was played with 16 teams in its 17th season, 1973–74. Last two teams relegated to Second League 1974–75. Mersin İY finished 15th with 8 wins and relegated to second division next year. MİY finished first half at 14th place. Manager Koka set a target for second half for top ten teams, the team couldn't achieve it. Şeref Başoğlu was the most scorer player with 5 goals.

Results summary
Mersin İdmanyurdu (MİY) 1973–74 First League summary:

Sources: 1973–74 Turkish First Football League pages.

League table
Mersin İY's league performance in Turkey First League in 1973–74 season is shown in the following table.

Note: Won, drawn and lost points are 2, 1 and 0. F belongs to MİY and A belongs to corresponding team for both home and away matches. Champions went to ECC 1974-75, and runners-up and second runners-up became eligible for UEFA Cup 1974-75.

Results by round
Results of games MİY played in 1973–74 First League by rounds:

First half

Second half

1973–74 Turkish Cup participation
1973–74  Turkish Cup was played for the 12th season as Türkiye Kupası by 27 teams. Two elimination rounds and finals were played in two-legs elimination system. Top ten first division teams from previous season participated. Mersin İdmanyurdu did not participate in 1973–74  Turkish Cup because they had finished previous season at 11th place. Fenerbahçe won the Cup for the 2nd time. Bursaspor (as the finalist) became eligible for 1974–75 ECW Cup.

Management

Club management
Mehmet Karamehmet was club president.

Coaching team

1973–74 Mersin İdmanyurdu head coaches:

Note: Only official games were included.

1973–74 squad
Stats are counted for 1973–74 First League matches. In the team rosters five substitutes were allowed to appear, two of whom were substitutable. Only the players who appeared in game rosters were included and listed in the order of appearance.

Sources: 1973–74 season squad data from maçkolik com, Milliyet, and Erbil (1975).

Transfer news from Milliyet:
 Transfers in: Atıf, Şeref (Sakaryaspor), Kemal (PTT), Hasan (Ankaragücü). Cevher (loaned from Fenerbahçe).
 Transfers out: Güray (Adana Demirspor); Tuncay (Trabzonspor).

See also
 Football in Turkey
 1973–74 Turkish First Football League
 1973–74 Turkish Cup

Notes and references

Mersin İdman Yurdu seasons
Turkish football clubs 1973–74 season